Harry Roberts was the co-inventor of julmust and co-founder of Roberts in Örebro in 1910, Sweden. After studying chemistry in Germany during the late 19th century he invented the soft drink together with his father Robert Roberts.

References 

20th-century Swedish inventors
Year of birth missing (living people)
Living people